This is a list of villages in  Potiskum Local Government Area of Yobe State, Nigeria.

Villages 

 Alaraba
 Badejo
 Chalumna
 Dagare
 Daniski
 Daria
 Dazigal
 Kukargadu
 Potiskum
 Siminti

References 

Populated places in Nigeria